Schizothorax davidi is a species of ray-finned fish in the genus Schizothorax which is found in the Sichuan and Yunnan Provinces of China .

References 

Schizothorax
Fish described in 1880